Lord Duncan was launched at Dublin in 1787 under another name. Between 1799 and 1800 she made one voyage as a slave ship in the triangular trade in enslaved people. She was sold in 1800 after she had delivered her slaves.

Career
Lord Duncan first appeared in Lloyd's Register (LR) in 1798.
	

	
Captain Charles King sailed from Liverpool on 7 March 1799. King had been a surgeon on slave voyages between 1785 and 1799, but this was his first voyage as a master. Lord Duncan stopped at Sierra Leone, but she arrived at Kingston, Jamaica on 2 February 1800 with 127 slaves acquired at the Congo River. Before reaching Kingston she had stopped at Martinique. She had left Liverpool with 23 crew members and had suffered three crew deaths on her voyage.
	
Although the registers carried Lord Duncan'' for some more years with unchanged data, her owners had sold her in the Americas after she had delivered her slaves.

Citations

References

1790s ships
Liverpool slave ships